Habronattus georgiensis is a species in the family Salticidae (jumping spiders), found in Georgia and the USA.

References

External links 

 Habronattus georgiensis at The world spider catalog

Salticidae
Spiders of the United States
Spiders described in 1944